Operation Noah's Ark was a World War II plan instigated by the British Special Operations Executive (SOE) to harass German troops as they withdrew from Greece. It was to encompass a series of operations, including Operation Underdone in Albania, to be executed by local partisan groups. In practice, it was not executed, due to lack of effective groups.

Sources 
 

Cancelled military operations of World War II
Greece in World War II
Special Operations Executive operations

Cancelled special forces operations